Amager Common (Danish: Amager Fælled) is a 223 hectare nature reserve on Amager in Copenhagen. It contains meadows, lakes, forests and a range of wildlife such as Highland cattle.

History 

The area where Amager Common now lies is a former military area. Abandoned in 1964, Amager Common gained protected status in two rounds: Kalvebodkilefredningen in 1990 and Amager Fælled fredningen in 1994.

Amager Common contained one of Copenhagen's execution sites, with the final execution taking place on April 22, 1845.

References 

Parks in Copenhagen
Parks and open spaces in Copenhagen